Thomas William Murphy (3 November 1863 – 26 July 1939) was a New Zealand boxer. An early World Featherweight Champion, he was the first world champion of any weightclass to come from New Zealand. In his early career, he took the New Zealand Lightweight Championship.

He was a prolific boxer who fought more than two hundred fights, with a few going as long as thirty and forty rounds.  He was known more for a powerful punch than an exceptional defense.

Early life and career
Murphy was born in Auckland and began boxing there before continuing his career in Australia. He called his deadly right, his "Torpedo" punch, which also referred to his ring name.

New Zealand Light champ, 1887
On 26 July 1887, he defeated Richard Long in a seventh round knockout at the Opera House in Wellington, New Zealand. The fight was billed as the Lightweight Championship of New Zealand. On 20 August 1887, he defeated John Scotty Fades at the Princess Theatre in a second round knockout at Dunedin, New Zealand, defending his title as Lightweight Champion of New Zealand. On 24 November 1887, he lost a New Zealand Lightweight Title bout with a sixth round disqualification against Ike Fake in Wellington, New Zealand.

He defended the title successfully on 23 June and 1 July 1888 against Joe Molloy and Edward Jones in two fifth round knockouts. These bouts demonstrated the strong punch he had in his early career. In a fourth round knockout, he defeated Jim Saxon in another New Zealand Lightweight Title match on 1 September 1888. On 2 February 1889, he lost to Tommy Williams at the Princess Theatre in Dunedin, New Zealand, in a fourth round disqualification, in what was billed as another New Zealand Lightweight Championship.

Coming to America, 1889
He arrived in San Francisco in June 1889 aboard the steamer Zelandia.

In his first fight in America, he defeated Johnny Griffin, an exceptionally talented featherweight, in a third round knockout at the California Club in San Francisco on 12 July 1889.

In an important bout on 30 July 1889, he fought a twenty-seven round draw against English champion Frank Murphy in what was billed as a World 120 pound title match. The bout was fought at the California Athletic Club in San Francisco for a purse of $1,800 dollars. In a close fight, Frank Murphy was down twice in the fifteenth, but had the better of the seventeenth through nineteenth rounds. Frank Murphy was down again in the twenty-second round.  The fight was stopped by Referee Cook with the help of the police in the twenty-seventh because neither men appeared to be able to continue the match.  Upon examination in their dressing rooms after the match, Billy Murphy was found to have a fracture of the radius of his left arm, and Frank Murphy's wrist was swollen and bruised. Torpedo Billy paused in his boxing schedule for five months to recover. From the twentieth through the final twenty-seventh round, both men appeared fatigued and did far less fighting than the first twenty rounds.

World Feather Champion, 1890

Murphey won the World Featherweight title on 13 January 1890 defeating Ike Weir in a fourteenth round knockout at the California Athletic Club in San Francisco, California. In the final round, possibly to show his dominance and contempt for his opponent, Weir did a backflip.  Murphey immediately unloaded a serious right as Weir landed, known as the "torpedo punch", which resulted in a knockdown that ended the bout after a count of ten.  The purse for the fight was $2,250.

According to one source, Weir, who led through much of the bout, was down repeatedly in the thirteenth round when Murphy rallied. In a rematch, on 2 November 1893, Murphy lost to Weir in a sixth round knockout, which was one of the high points of Weir's late career. In the fourth round, Weir knocked Murphy entirely out of the ring.  Weir successfully used his clever ducking and bobbing as a defense in the fight, avoiding Murphy's powerful right which had plagued him in their earlier title bout.

Losing World Feather title, 1890
After the match with Weir, he defeated Tommy Warren, Tommy White, and Eddie Greaney before returning to Australia in September 1890. Murphy was considered to have forfeited his title because he left the United States to return to New Zealand. However, Australia and New Zealand continued to recognize his title until he lost to Albert Griffiths known as Young Griffo in Sydney on 2 September 1890.  The bout was recognized as a Featherweight World Title match by Great Britain and Australia. Griffo was knocked down twice in the first three rounds.  The fight ended in the fifteenth when a right to Murphy's jaw led him to throw off his gloves and concede the fight.

He would lose to Young Griffo again on 22 July 1891 at the Sydney Amateur Athletic Club in another World Featherweight Title match.  The bout would end in a twenty-second round disqualification against Murphy.

Boxing after return to the United States
He returned to the United States in 1892 to continue boxing. On 6 February 1892, he was knocked out by Johnny Griffith in a 122 pound Featherweight Title match in Brooklyn, New York.  Both boxers complained of injuries to their hands, not uncommon considering the thin gloves used in most bouts.

On 31 May 1892, he fought Johnny Murphy in San Francisco in a forty round no contest bout that was billed as a 122 pound World Championship.  On 28 December 1892, in San Francisco, he had a rematch with Tommy White, whom he had defeated two years earlier, that ended in an epic thirty-four round no contest. The bout was for a $2,500 purse. In the fifteenth, White lost his momentum and was dropped by Murphy in the following round. From the seventeenth, to the twenty-ninth little fighting was done, both boxers to exhausted or disinclined to give or receive much punishment.  The referee said he would allow four more rounds, but stopped the fight on the thirty-fourth as there was too little boxing taking place. No blows were landed in the last eleven rounds, and some in the crowd suspected the fight was fixed.  All betting was declared off by the third round by the referee.

In an unusual match on 16 December 1893, in Paterson, New Jersey, with George Dixon, Murphy was disqualified in the third round for a blow to the referee.  Dixon had the best of the first round.  Trying to break the fighters from clinching in the third round, Murphy hit Referee James Stoddard with a right in the face either accidentally or distracted by the heat of the moment, and infuriated, Stoddard retaliated with two quick blows that landed Murphy under the ropes. The house became wild, but the police managed to keep order. Some papers described the fight as a knockout, though the referee, not Dixon put Murphy on the mat.

Losses to champions Dixon, Santry, Forbes, and Harris
He fought George Dixon on 22 January 1897 at the Broadway Athletic Club in Brooklyn, losing in a six round knockout. The fight was billed as a 120 pound World Featherweight Title match.  Manager Sam Fitzpatrick had predicted that Dixon would have the edge in the bout.  As the bout was with a former World Champion, it attracted considerable interest, and Dixon led the betting by odds of 2 to 1.  Murphy held his own for the first three rounds, but looked fatigued by the last three, while Dixon remained fresh and unfazed by the blows of Murphy. Murphy was knocked down and out in the sixth by a strong left to the stomach.

On 26 November 1898, he was knocked out by a rising Chicago star, Eddie Santry, who would take the World Featherweight Championship, according to most sources, the following year against English boxer Ben Jordan.  Murphy's knockout loss to Santry took place in the fourth round at the Commercial Athletic Club in St. Louis, Missouri.

On 29 April 1899, he lost in a four round knockout to future World Bantamweight Champion Harry Forbes at the Chicago Athletic Association in Chicago, Illinois.  On 19 May 1899, he lost to 1901 World Bantamweight Champion Harry Harris in a fourth round knockout at the Star Theatre in Chicago.

Return to Australia in 1904
In 1904, he returned to Australia and continued his boxing career, fighting around fifteen additional bouts.  His last battle was with Jimmy Ross in Auckland in 1906.

He died at his home in Auckland, New Zealand, on 26 July 1939 at the age of 75.

Recognition
Murphy was inducted into the New Zealand Sports Hall of Fame in 1990.

Professional boxing record
All information in this section is derived from BoxRec, unless otherwise stated.

Official record

All newspaper decisions are officially regarded as “no decision” bouts and are not counted in the win/loss/draw column.

Unofficial record

Record with the inclusion of newspaper decisions in the win/loss/draw column.

See also
List of lineal boxing world champions
List of featherweight boxing champions

References

Further reading
 O'Brien, Brian F., Kiwis With Gloves On, published 1960, Reed.

External links
 
 "Torpedo" Billy Murphy Cyber Boxing Zone

|-

1863 births
1939 deaths
Featherweight boxers
World boxing champions
World featherweight boxing champions
New Zealand male boxers
New Zealand world boxing champions
Irish male boxers
New Zealand professional boxing champions